To Challenge Tomorrow is a role-playing game published by Ragnarok Enterprises in 1983 that can be adapted to any setting or time period. Reviews were mixed, with some reviewers saying there were some good concepts, while others found too many issues with the rules.

Description
To Challenge Tomorrow is a universal system for historical, contemporary, or future settings. The rules are general such that they include many possibilities; it is a skill-based system, with skill scores heavily modified by a character's basic statistics. The set consists of three books: "Past, Present & Future SF & Historical Rules" (32 pages), with rules for character creation, skills, psychic skills, and combat; "Worlds of Adventure" (32 pages), which describes 12 time periods, from the 15th century to the 30th; and "Adventures" (20 pages), four miniscenarios.

Publication history
To Challenge Tomorrow was designed by David F. Nalle, and published by Ragnarok Enterprises in 1983 as a digest-sized box containing a 32-page book, a 32-page book, and a 20-page book, and a sample character sheet.

Reception
In the Special Edition #2 of Ares Magazine (1983), Jerry Epperson commented that "It is best suited to those who are looking for a simple, realistic, and quick RPG system that can expand to the limits of the imagination. It will be a tough act to follow."

In the January–February 1985 edition of Space Gamer (No. 72), William Barton commented that "if you can look beyond its production limitations, I think you'll find To Challenge Tomorrow a worthwhile purchase, even if for nothing else than several good gaming concepts.".

In the January–February 1985 edition of Different Worlds (Issue #38), Matt Stevens gave it a below-average rating of 1.5 stars out of 4, and outlined issues with several parts of the rules. He concluded, "The basic rules are probably the most important section of all, so it is pretty hard for me to recommend a game when the rules are terrible. While it seems that a lot of effort was put into this game, and while it does have a lot of original features, I can't really recommend it. It's unfortunate because I think this could have really worked."

References

Role-playing games introduced in 1983
Universal role-playing games